Exandria Unlimited (ExU) is an American actual play anthology web series where the cast plays Dungeons & Dragons using the fifth edition ruleset. It is set in the Exandria campaign setting and is a spin-off of the web series Critical Role. 

The first season follows the Crown Keepers, a party of adventurers, in their travels across the continent of Tal'Dorei. It was originally broadcast from June 24 to August 12, 2021 with a two-part continuation released at the end of March 2022. The second season, titled Exandria Unlimited: Calamity, was broadcast from May 26 to June 16, 2022. It follows a group of heroes from the Age of Arcanum who attempt to prevent the Calamity.

Premise 
Exandria Unlimited (ExU) is set in the city of Emon on the continent of Tal'Dorei 30 years after Campaign One and 10 years after Campaign Two. IGN reported, in June 2021, that "Exandria Unlimited will be considered canon within the wider Critical Role story, and 'will affect future environments and timelines across the overall lore of Critical Role.' So as fans await what may come from Campaign 3 of the core CR cast, Unlimited looks to offer a new vantage point into the world of Exandria". IGN also highlighted that "it's likely not the only such story planned; the announcement for the series teases that 'Within the world of Exandria, there are an unlimited amount of stories to be told - and we have only just begun'." 

Exandria Unlimited: Kymal follows Dorian Storm's return to his friends after his time in Campaign Three and the party's subsequent adventure in the Tal'Dorei city of Kymal.

Exandria Unlimited: Calamity follows a new group of heroes from the Age of Arcanum who attempt to prevent the Calamity. It is set in the floating city of Avalir. Nerdist highlighted, "as the second age of Exandria, the Age of Arcanum is set about 1,500 years before the events of Critical Role. So they're digging way back into the world's past". The Calamity was an apocalyptic series of events caused by a civil war among the Exandrian pantheon and their followers. This war imperiled the entirety of Exandria and "only one-third of the [world's] population" survived.

Production 
On June 10, 2021, Critical Role announced a new eight-episode limited series, titled Exandria Unlimited, which premiered on June 24, 2021. It aired between the end of Critical Role's second campaign and the start of the third campaign. In March 2022, Critical Role announced that the two-part adventure continuation, titled Exandria Unlimited: Kymal, would be released at the end of the month.

In May 2022, they announced that the four-episode long second season, titled Exandria Unlimited: Calamity. It premiered on May 26, 2022 and aired during the hiatus of Critical Role's third campaign.

Development 
Marisha Ray, creator of ExU and creative director of Critical Role Productions, highlighted that the franchise decided to run ExU to both explore new aspects of Exandria and to avoid burnout for the main Critical Role cast, especially Matthew Mercer—creator of the Exandria campaign setting and the main campaign's Dungeon Master. Ray said, "Realistically, we only get to experience Exandria through the eyes of a handful of people, in a very linear setting with each campaign. But there's a lot of other shit going on, not just on the other side of the planet but throughout time and history. So beyond just wanting to explore more of Exandria itself, we also wanted to explore more stories from different storytellers, and to show that anybody can create and build within the world of Exandria".

Aabria Iyengar (known for other streaming shows such as Happy Jacks RPG, Dimension 20, and Saving Throw) is the first season's Dungeon Master – it is the first Critical Role show to feature a Dungeon Master other than Mercer. On the design aspect for a limited series, Iyengar said, "It's the perfect thing because it creates this narrative scalpel. It's a very different type of storytelling in a familiar world".

Brennan Lee Mulligan, the second season's Dungeon Master, told SyFy Wire that "he was inspired to set his potential ExU series in this mythical historical era following a conversation over dinner he had with Mercer in 2021 about the then-burgeoning idea for the spinoff series". Mulligan stated that Mercer "mentioned the Age of Arcanum and The Calamity and there was a little something in his voice. Like, 'Not idly do the leaves of Lórien fall.' With him saying it, I could tell it was a part of the world he had envisioned that ExU would explore". Mulligan credits Mercer, Ray, lore keeper Dani Carr, and producer Kyle Shire for helping him "define this time period" and "supporting his vision". On setting Calamity during an apocalypse, Mulligan said, "If your only question is 'does the Calamity happen or not?' that's a different series. The question here is 'What is the nature of mortal beings when faced with this?' [...] There are different — and, in my opinion, more interesting — questions to be answered here than 'does the doom come or no?'".

Casting 
The first season is helmed by Iyengar and features Critical Role cast members Ashley Johnson, Liam O'Brien, Mercer as players. ExU also introduces two additional newcomers to Critical Role – Robbie Daymond and Aimee Carrero. Johnson plays as the faun druid Fearne Calloway, Daymond plays as the air genasi bard Dorian Storm, O'Brien plays as the halfling fighter Orym of the Air Ashari, Carrero plays as the human warlock Opal, and Mercer plays as the dwarf sorcerer Dariax Zaveon.

Daymond, O'Brien, and Johnson reprise their ExU characters in Critical Role's third campaign; while ExU's first season takes place chronologically before the third campaign, Kymal is concurrent to the third campaign. Daymond's character Dorian exited the third campaign after fourteen episodes. Daymond, Mercer, Carrero, and Iyengar reprised their roles for Exandria Unlimited: Kymal. Anjali Bhimani, who was previously an ExU guest star, also reprised her role as the fire genasi monk Fy'ra Rai. Erica Lindbeck joined the cast as Morrighan Ferus, a lagomore rogue.

Exandria Unlimited: Calamity is led by Mulligan as the Dungeon Master. It features Iyengar and Critical Role cast members Ray, Sam Riegel, Travis Willingham as players along with newcomers Lou Wilson and Luis Carazo. Their characters are high-level and showcase races and subclasses new to the Exandria setting. Carazo plays as the human paladin Zerxus Ilerus, Riegel plays as the changeling bard/warlock Loquatius Seelie, Iyengar plays as the elf wizard Architect Arcane Laerryn Coramar-Seelie, Wilson plays as the human sorcerer/bard Guildmaster Nydas Okiro, Willingham plays as the eisfuura rogue Cerrit Agrupnin, Guardian of the Seventh, and Ray plays as the elf wizard Patia Por'co, The Keeper of Scrolls.

Episodes

Series overview

Exandria Unlimited (2021–22)

Exandria Unlimited: Calamity (2022)
{{Episode table |background=#B40000 |season=5 |title=30 |airdate=15 |aux4=55 |seasonT = Episode| |aux4T=Notes
{{Episode list
 |EpisodeNumber = 1
 |Title = Excelsior
 |OriginalAirDate = 
 |Aux4 = Calamity was broadcast in Critical Role'''s timeslot during campaign three's hiatus.
 |ShortSummary = 
 }}
 
  
  
 }}

 Reception 
Chris King, for Polygon in July 2021, commented that the show's episode length is a potential barrier of entry and that the opening hook "can leave newcomers feeling as though they're missing something". King also called Iyengar "extraordinary" with a "unique style" and highlighted that "Iyengar's work here goes a long way toward proving that Critical Role doesn't always need Mercer at the head of the table to succeed". In a review of episode eight, The Geekly Grind highlighted that "this series wasn't to everyone's tastes, but overall I think it was a fun little mini-series to give the Critters nation a little taste of what the Critical Role channel could become in the future. [...] This was a fun, crazy,  and fantastic start to a great new series. I hope to see new GMs and players (both DnD vets and newbies) in future series. As much as I'm jonesing for another longform campaign, these quick mini-series have a real potential to snag many new friends and viewers to Critical Role".

Jennifer Melzer, for CBR in August 2021, wrote that "Iyengar's style is incredibly different from Critical Role's main Dungeon Master Matthew Mercer [...]. While both approach Dungeons & Dragons wholeheartedly with the story in mind, Iyengar went above and beyond at times to see her players flesh out their in-game vision in ways some DMs may consider controversial – but it worked". Melzer highlighted that early poor dice rolls led to the characters' rough start, "however, their struggles became incredibly endearing". Melzer commented that "incorporating history, lore, story elements and even characters from past campaigns made the world familiar enough that it was easy for fans to fall in love with the story, the new players and the new DM even while missing those not at the table. [...]  The mini-campaign did more than just hold fans over until the next full season – it was a successful experiment that deserves to come back in the future".

Melzer, for CBR in April 2022, highlighted Exandria Unlimited: Kymal; she commented on the plot threads that were revisited in Kymal, though, "Iyengar and the cast managed to leave fans with some serious cliffhangers and a brand new cast member they want to know more about. While it may not be entirely feasible for Critical Role to turn EU'' into a weekly campaign, there is certainly room (and fan desire) to at least see the cast more often. [...] The success of the side-series and number of plot threads left dangling make it all but inevitable that the Crown Keepers will reappear at some point, hopefully in a more permanent fashion".

References 

2020s YouTube series
2021 web series debuts
Actual play web series
American non-fiction web series
Anthology web series
Audio podcasts
Critical Role
Dungeons & Dragons actual play